Aziz Mirzan Murad (17 January 1960 – 12 February 2022) was a Malaysian actor, writer, playwright and theatre activist, who was mostly active in film, television and theatre. Known universally by the nickname 'Jit', he was the eldest son of former Director-General of Education of Malaysia, Murad bin Mohamed Noor (10 April 1930 – 22 Januari 2008).

Life and career
Educated at Victoria Institution in the 1970s, he went on to study sociology and urban planning in Chicago, before obtaining a master's degree in 20th Century Art History in San Francisco.

He returned to Malaysia and in December 1989, he co-founded the Instant Cafe Theatre Company which gained a following for its biting social and political satire.

His first play Gold Rain and Hailstones (1992) was staged in Kuala Lumpur, Penang and Singapore.

In 1993 Murad helped start Dramalab, an arm of ICT specifically dedicated to encouraging new writing.

His notable works included Storyteller (1996), based on South-East Asian spoken traditions, Visits (2002), a reworked version of a 1990s comedy, and Spilt Gravy On Rice (2002), which won four awards at the inaugural Cameronian Arts Award 2003.

He was also a noted standup comedian and scriptwriter.

Death
He died in his home in Kuala Lumpur on 12 February 2022, at the age of 62 due to cardiac arrest. He was buried at the Bukit Kiara Muslim Cemetery in Kuala Lumpur.

Filmography

Films

Television

Stage

Bibliography
 Jit Murad. Jit Murad Plays. Matahari Books (2017). ISBN 9789672128182
 Jit Murad. Two Things. Rhino Press (1997). ISBN 9839476033

References

External links
 

1960 births
2022 deaths
Malaysian film actors
Malaysian male actors
Malaysian stage actors
Malaysian television actors
People from Alor Setar
People from Kedah
People from Kuala Lumpur